KOHO-FM (101.1 FM) is a radio station licensed to Leavenworth, Washington, United States, serving the Wenatchee area. The station is currently owned by Icicle Broadcasting, Inc., and airs Northwest Public Broadcasting's 24-hour Jazz service as a simulcast of KJEM in Pullman.

History

The station was assigned the call sign KLVH on March 25, 1994; it signed on in 1998. Its call sign was changed to KOHO-FM on August 20, 1999; the new name was derived from coho salmon. The station was founded by the Icicle Broadcasting Corporation, owned by Harriet Bullitt, and primarily played adult alternative and jazz.

On April 8, 2022, it was announced that the station will flip to Northwest Public Broadcasting's jazz network, based at KJEM, on April 19. At Midnight on April 19, KOHO-FM's stream went silent for several hours before beginning the simulcast with KJEM during the 9 am hour.

References

External links

OHO-FM
OHO
Radio stations established in 1998
1998 establishments in Washington (state)
Jazz radio stations in the United States